Yuriy Krivtsov (born 7 February 1979) is a French professional road bicycle racer, who last rode for the  team. Ukrainian by birth, he became a naturalized French citizen in May 2010, and was able to change his nationality per the UCI effective the 2011 season.

Major results

1996
3rd, World U23 Time Trial Championships 
2002
1st Prix des Blés d'Or
2003
 1 stage, Tour de Romandie
 1 stage, Circuit de la Sarthe
 1 stage, Tour de l'Avenir
2004
1st  National Time Trial Championships
4th Chrono des Herbiers
7th GP des Nations
2005
2nd Duo Normand (with Erki Pütsep)
4th Chrono Champenois
6th Grand Prix de Denain
6th Chrono des Herbiers
9th Overall Tour de Luxembourg
9th Overall Tour du Poitou-Charentes
2006
2nd National Time Trial Championships
6th Chrono des Nations
2007
4th Chrono des Nations
2008
4th Omloop Het Volk
2009
3rd Chrono des Nations
7th Overall Driedaagse van West-Vlaanderen
2010
2nd National Time Trial Championships
6th Duo Normand (with David Lelay)
9th Chrono des Nations
2011
8th Duo Normand (with David Lelay)

References

External links 
Profile at AG2R Prévoyance official website

Ukrainian male cyclists
1979 births
People from Pervomaisk, Mykolaiv Oblast
Living people
Olympic cyclists of Ukraine
Cyclists at the 2004 Summer Olympics
Sportspeople from Mykolaiv Oblast